The Volvo Masters of Asia was the final event of the season on golf's Asian Tour until 2008.

It was first played in 2002 and the field was originally restricted to the top 60 players on the Asian Tour's Order of Merit, increasing to 65 in the final year.

In 2006 the prize fund went up to US$650,000 and in 2007 and 2008 to US$750,000. Even though it is not close to being the richest tournament on the Asian Tour, the Volvo Masters of Asia was the tour's designated "Premier Event" for Official World Golf Ranking purposes, with a minimum winner's point allocation set at 20, regardless of the strength of the field. The winner also received a Waterford crystal vase.

Tournament hosts
2002–2004 Kota Permai Golf and Country Club in Malaysia
2003 Bangkok Golf Club in Thailand
2005–2008 Thai Country Club in Thailand

Winners

See also
Volvo Masters of Malaysia

References

External links
 Website Asian Tour

Former Asian Tour events
Golf tournaments in Malaysia
Golf tournaments in Thailand
Recurring sporting events established in 2002
Recurring sporting events disestablished in 2008
2002 establishments in Asia
2008 disestablishments in Asia